Oisterwijk is a municipality and a city in the south of the Netherlands.

Population centres 
Haaren
Heukelom
Moergestel
Oisterwijk

Topography

Dutch topographic map of the municipality of Oisterwijk, 2021

Transportation

 Railway station: Oisterwijk

City 

Oisterwijk received city rights in 1230. Part of the municipality of Oisterwijk includes the 'Oisterwijkse bossen en vennen' (Oisterwijk forests and fens) and the 'Kampina', two nature reserves. The reserves are owned and kept by the 'Vereniging Natuurmonumenten' (Nature Monuments Society).

Notable people 

 Nicolaus van Esch (1507 in Oisterwijk – 1578) a Dutch Roman Catholic theologian and mystical writer
 Adriaan Poirters (1605 in Oisterwijk – 1674) a Dutch Jesuit poet and prose writer, active in the Counter Reformation
 Johan Antony Barrau (1873 in Oisterwijk – 1953) a Dutch mathematician and geometer
 Arnold Meijer (1905 – 1965 in Oisterwijk) a Dutch fascist politician
 Annita van Iersel (born 1948 in Oisterwijk) former wife of Paul Keating, former Prime Minister of Australia
 Jan Schuurkes (born 1950 in Oisterwijk) a Dutch biologist and gastrointestinal researcher
 Cora van Nieuwenhuizen (born 1963 in Ridderkerk) a Dutch politician, municipal councillor 1994 to 2006

Gallery

References

External links

Official website

 
Cities in the Netherlands
Municipalities of North Brabant
Populated places in North Brabant
1230 establishments in Europe